SpongeBob's Boating Bash is a racing game made by American studio Impulse Games based on the animated comedy TV series SpongeBob SquarePants. It features SpongeBob SquarePants characters and is the first SpongeBob racing game since Nicktoons Winners Cup Racing. It is also the first SpongeBob game released by Firebrand Games for the Nintendo DS and ImPulse Games for the Wii. It is compatible with the Wii Wheel accessory. The game features more than 100 different options to customize a boat, and can be played with up to 4 people. Even though it is in the racing genre, most of the game's modes are comparable to a demolition derby.

Plot
At Mrs. Puff's Boating School, it's the last test of the year and SpongeBob, as per usual, manages to horrendously fail on his boating test. As he sits on the steps on the entrance to the school, looking quite depressed, a shark named Seymour Scales arrives outside the school in a bus, to find SpongeBob sitting on the entrance ramp. Seymour then tricks him into his "D.R.I.V.E." (Destruction, Recklessness, Impairment, Velocity, Escape) classes. As the player progresses through the game, SpongeBob unlocks more friends to sign up. After the final exams, SpongeBob gets his boating licence. But Mrs. Puff informs him it's not real. Then, SpongeBob sees Seymour going into a truck, attempting to escape, after SpongeBob realizes that it was a scam. This leads to a final battle, fought in vehicles, in which SpongeBob wins. He then decides to go to Mrs. Puff's Boating School next year, and Seymour is sent to jail.

Gameplay
Throughout the game's Story mode, players engage in several racing and combat-centric objectives, each based on the D.R.I.V.E. acronym. These can also be freely selected and played outside of the Story mode:
Destruction: The first class in Seymour's D.R.I.V.E. lessons. It requires the player to smash into opponents' boats and pick up the parts that are produced from the smash. In some tests during the Story mode, the player is required to reach a set amount of collected parts. In others, the player has to finish in the Top 3 to achieve either a ranking.
Recklessness: This class requires the player to smash into opponents' boats, which awards points to the player. In some tests, the player is required to achieve a set score target, while in others, the player must place in the Top 3 to receive a ranking.
Reckless Velocity: Reckless Velocity is a variation of Recklessness, and is a combination of Recklessness and Velocity, which is the fourth class in the D.R.I.V.E series. Reckless Velocity requires players to complete a race within a certain time limit and also earn a certain number of points to obtain a ranking.
Impairment: In this class, players must knock out opponents within a set time limit. When the player collides with an opposition player, stars form around that opponent, and they are briefly stopped in the current position. This gives the player the opportunity to repeatedly smash that opponent, eventually knocking them out.
Velocity: The player must complete a race against up to seven opponents as fast as possible. To achieve a ranking, the player must finish in Top 3.
Escape: The player must knock opponents out while they actively hunt down the player. The damage done to opponents is increased massively, however, damage done to the player is also increased. Escape occurs in waves, and at the end of each wave, the player's car will be slightly healed, the amount decreasing on each wave. The player must destroy as many cars as possible, again to achieve a ranking.

Cast
Tom Kenny as SpongeBob

Mary Jo Catlett as Mrs. Puff

John O'Hurley as Seymour Scales

Bill Fagerbakke as Patrick

Carolyn Lawrence as Sandy

Bob Joles as Mr. Krabs

Tim Conway as Barnacle Boy

Mr. Lawrence as Plankton

References

2010 video games
Nintendo DS games
Wii games
THQ games
SpongeBob SquarePants video games
Racing video games
Video games developed in the United Kingdom
Wii Wheel games
Firebrand Games games
Multiplayer and single-player video games
Video games developed in the United States